Jugraj Singh (1971 – 8 April 1990), better known as Toofan Singh, was a militant member of the Khalistan Liberation Force who was born in 1971 in Sri Hargobindpur, Punjab, India. According to police records, he was allegedly involved in 150 killings. He was killed in an encounter on April 8, 1990.

Biography
Born in 1971 as Jugraj Singh in Cheema village of Punjab. He had 5 sisters and was the only son of his parents. In 1984, he was emotionally affected by the news of Operation Blue Star. He begin to believe that he has to do something about the alleged atrocities against Sikhs. In his younger days, he spent some days in the Nabha Jail.  In the jail, he met with Manbir Singh Chaheru and Baldev Singh. Baldev Singh told Gujraj that he should avoid getting into these fights since he is the only son of his family, however, Gujraj would not change his path.

In 1987, he came into contact with Avtar Singh Brahma the chief of Khalistan Liberation Force and he would fight under him. Toofan Singh's name first appeared in the complaint registered to Punjab Armed Police Headquarters concerning the murder of police officer Govindram as the major prepatrator. On one hand Singh had support from Sikh society, and on other hand police forces would continue trailing him.

He was noted to have provided protection to the villagers from attacks and extortion by criminal gangs, terrorist groups and the police.

On 8 April 1990, Singh was killed in a village near Hargobindpur, after police and BSF surrounded his home. According to police records, he was allegedly involved in 150 killings.

On the day of his cremation it is estimated that almost four lakh (400,000) people were gathered to pay him the last tribute.

Legacy
Singh was considered as a martyr, and poets sang in praise of his bravery.

In 2017, a biographical film based on the life of Singh was internationally released, titled Toofan Singh. The Indian Central Board of Film Certification banned the movie.

References

1971 births
Insurgency in Punjab
1990 deaths
Khalistan movement people
Sikh martyrs
People killed by law enforcement officers